New synthesis may refer to:
 In biology, the modern evolutionary synthesis joins elements of different theories in biology to describe evolution
 In economics, the new neoclassical synthesis that fuses elements of new Keynesianism with new classical macroeconomic thought
The New Synthesis, a Maoist school of thought created by Bob Avakian